William Leigh Thompson (August 11, 1937 – June 21, 2018) was a Democratic member of the Wyoming House of Representatives, representing the 60th district from 2001 until his retirement in 2011.

Background
Thompson was born in Casper, Wyoming and went to Wyoming Midwest High School. He received his associated degree from Casper College. Thompson also received his bachelor's degree from the University of Wyoming and his master's degree from Utah State University. Thompson was a teacher at the Green River High School, the Sweetwater County School District Number 2, from 1961 until 1996.

Political career
When incumbent Democratic Representative Louise Ryckman announced her retirement, Thompson ran unopposed in the Democratic primary and was elected with 62.9% of the vote. Thompson served as House Minority Whip between 2003 and 2007. He was reelected four more times before announcing his retirement in 2011, and was succeeded by fellow educator and Democrat John Freeman.

Death
Thompson died on June 21, 2018, in Green River, Wyoming at the age of 80.

References

External links
Wyoming State Legislature - Representative Bill Thompson
Project Vote Smart - Representative Bill Thompson (WY)
Follow the Money - Bill Thompson
2006 2004 2002 2000 campaign contributions

1937 births
2018 deaths
Democratic Party members of the Wyoming House of Representatives
Politicians from Casper, Wyoming
Casper College alumni
University of Wyoming alumni
Utah State University alumni
Educators from Wyoming
People from Green River, Wyoming